Chishti Sharif (also known as Chisht-e Sharif or Chisht) is a town situated  on the northern bank of the Hari River in Herat Province, Afghanistan. It is the administrative center of Chishti Sharif District.

History
The Chishti Order of Sufi mystics began in Chishti Sharif about 930 CE.  Maudood Chishti is buried there, in a large mausoleum.

Chishti Sharif contains two historic domes (gumbads) built by Ghiyath al-Din Muhammad of the Ghurid dynasty. The eastern dome was damaged by a tank shell at some point during the Afghanistan conflict.

Climate
Chisti Sharif has a hot-summer humid continental climate (Köppen: Dsa). Precipitation mostly falls in spring and winter.

Gallery

References

Populated places in Herat Province
Chishti Order